Aytsemnik Urartu (1899–1974) was an Armenian sculptor. On her death, Urartu was buried at Yerevan City Pantheon.

References

1899 births
1974 deaths
20th-century Armenian women artists
Armenian women sculptors
20th-century Armenian sculptors